Tommy Gale (September 10, 1934 – September 30, 1999) was a NASCAR Winston Cup Series race car driver from McKeesport, Pennsylvania who raced from 1968 to 1986. He ended up becoming one of the runners-up for the 1977 NASCAR Rookie of the Year award.

Career
Gale started as a NASCAR Cup Series rookie when he was 34 years old and competed until his retirement at the age of 51. Leading only three laps of his 60,655-lap spanning career, Gale managed to make $683,965 in total winnings ($ when adjusted for inflation). While starting in 27th place on average, his average finishes were 22nd place after competing in a grueling  of top-level professional stock car racing.

His only three DNQs came at the 1972 Miller High Life 500, the 1973 Daytona 500 and at the 1984 Talladega 500.

Gale's strongest performances are on short oval tracks where he finished an average of 20th place. His weakness would be found on road courses; where a finish of 28th place would be expected out of Gale. His primary vehicle throughout his career was the #64 Ford machine owned by fellow NASCAR driver Elmo Langley.

Post-NASCAR career
After Tommy Gale retired from NASCAR, he decided to focus on his son and started a trucking business in Elizabeth, Pennsylvania; which is near his hometown of McKeesport.

References

External links
 

1934 births
1999 deaths
Sportspeople from McKeesport, Pennsylvania
Racing drivers from Pennsylvania
Racing drivers from Pittsburgh
NASCAR drivers